The discography of The Roots, an American hip hop band, consists of fourteen studio albums, plus three collaborative studio albums, three compilation albums, two extended plays, and two live albums. The Roots began performing in 1989 as The Square Roots with rapper Black Thought and drummer Questlove. Rapper Malik B., and bassist Leonard Hubbard joined the band in 1991. Over its history, Questlove and Black Thought have always remained with The Roots while their lineup of backing musicians has changed.

In 1993, The Roots debuted with independently released album Organix, and signed to DGC Records (later MCA Records) that same year. The Roots' debuted on Geffen with Do You Want More?!!!??!, an album that was unique in hip hop for using no sampling, and being embraced more by fans of alternative rock than fans of hip hop. Do You Want More?!!!??! peaked at only number 104 on the Billboard 200 chart in the US. Illadelph Halflife, the third album by the Roots, peaked at number twenty-one on the Billboard 200. In 1999, The Roots' fourth album Things Fall Apart became the band's biggest success. The album was certified gold in the US, and its single "You Got Me" peaked at number thirty-nine on the Billboard Hot 100, and number nineteen on the Hot Rap Tracks chart. "You Got Me" won the Grammy Award for Best Rap Performance by a Duo or Group in 2000. In 2002, The Roots released Phrenology, which contained the band's second single to chart on the Hot 100. "Break You Off", which featured Musiq Soulchild, peaked at number ninety-nine.

The Roots founded the company Okayplayer, and released The Tipping Point in 2004. In 2006, The Roots signed to Def Jam, and released Game Theory under Def Jam and Rising Down in 2008; the band's album How I Got Over was released in 2010. The Roots released two live concert albums, the first being The Roots Come Alive in 2000, and the next The Roots Present in 2005. In 2009, The Roots became the house band for the late-night show Late Night with Jimmy Fallon and in 2014, upon Fallon's take over of The Tonight Show, The Roots moved to that series.

Albums

Studio albums

Compilation albums

Live albums

Extended plays

Singles

A.  Charted only on the Bubbling Under Hot 100 Singles or Bubbling Under R&B/Hip-Hop Singles charts, 25-song extensions to the Billboard Hot 100 and Hot R&B/Hip-Hop Songs charts respectively.
B.  Charted only on the Hot Singles Sales or Hot R&B/Hip-Hop Singles Sales charts.
C.  Charted only on the R&B/Hip-Hop Digital Songs chart.

Other appearances

Music videos
1993: "Pass the Popcorn" (as The Square Roots)
1994: "Distortion to Static"
1994: "Proceed"
1994: "Proceed II"
1995: "Silent Treatment"
1996: "Clones"
1996: "Concerto of the Desperado"
1996: "What They Do"
1999: "You Got Me" 
1999: "The Next Movement"
1999: "What You Want"
2000: "Glitches" 
2002: "Break You Off" 
2003: "The Seed 2.0" 
2004: "Don't Say Nothin'"
2004: "Star"
2004: "I Don't Care"
2006: "In the Music/Here I Come/Don't Feel Right"
2008: "75 Bars (Black's Reconstruction)"
2008: "Get Busy"
2008: "Birthday Girl"
2008: "Rising Up"
2009: "How I Got Over"
2010: "Dear God 2.0"
2010: "The Fire"
2010: "Hard Times (Studio Video)"
2010: "I Can't Write Left Handed (Studio Video)"
2010: "Wake Up Everybody"
2011: "Undun: The Short Clips ("Make My", "Stomp", "Tip The Scale", "Sleep")
2014: "When the People Cheer"
2014: "Understand"

References

External links
 

Roots, The
Hip hop discographies
Rhythm and blues discographies
Discography